Programa Raul Gil is a musical and varieties TV show hosted by Raul Gil broadcast in SBT since 1981 to 1984, was also previously broadcast in the channels Excelsior (1967-1970), Tupi (1978-1980), Record (1973-1978; 1980-1981; 1984-1996 and 1998-2005), Manchete (1996-1998) and Band (2005-2010). In 2010, Raul Gil returned to SBT with the same program, on June 26, 2010 and continues currently displayed.

References

External links 
 
 

Sistema Brasileiro de Televisão original programming
RecordTV original programming
Rede Bandeirantes original programming
Brazilian television talk shows
1960s Brazilian television series
1970s Brazilian television series
1980s Brazilian television series
1990s Brazilian television series
2000s Brazilian television series
2010s Brazilian television series